Dendroscope is an interactive computer software program written in Java for viewing Phylogenetic trees. This program is designed to view trees of all sizes and is very useful for creating figures. Dendroscope can be used for a variety of analyses of molecular data sets but is particularly designed for metagenomics or analyses of uncultured environmental samples.   

It was developed by Daniel Huson and his colleagues at the University of Tübingen in Germany, who also created SplitsTree.

See also 
List of phylogenetic tree visualization software
SplitsTree
MEGAN

References

External links
 Dendroscope homepage
 List of phylogeny software, hosted at the University of Washington

Phylogenetics software